Pekka Einari Viljanen (born 11 March 1945 in Vihti) is a Finnish farmer and politician. He was a member of the Parliament of Finland from 1991 to 1995, representing the Centre Party.

References

1945 births
Living people
People from Vihti
Finnish Lutherans
Centre Party (Finland) politicians
Members of the Parliament of Finland (1991–95)